His Highness Mir Tharo Khan, Sitara-i-Jang, was the founder of the Mankani Talpur state in southeastern Sindh. Talpurs defeated Kalhora rulers and founded their rule over Sindh. Mir Tharo Khan Talpur participated in the Battle of Halani against Kalhoras. However, when Mir Fateh Ali Talpur started rule from Hyderabad (Sindh), HH Mir Tharo Khan Talpur went to southeastern Sindh and founded a state under his own crown, which was called the state of Mir Pur Khas in 1784, located at  Keti Mir Tharo.

Sindhi people
Talpur dynasty
Nawabs of Pakistan